The Pen Pals are an indie folk music group composed of artists Jetty Rae and Heath McNease. The group is known for its minimalist style and layered vocal harmonies. To date, they have released 2 albums: 'Gold' (2016) and 'I Disappear' (2017), the latter of which is said to have 'introspective lyrics of loss, sorrow, perseverance and hope'. The group itself has been cited as a 'gentler, more harmonic version of The Civil Wars'.

Discography
The Pen Pals have released 2 albums in their career:

Gold (2015) 
Released on September 17, 2015 described by one reviewer as "folk pop". The album spent 5 days as the most downloaded on NoiseTrade. The theme of the album is a romance that begins and ends with summer.

I Disappear (2017) 
Released on July 28, 2017 with a music video for the title track. The songs written are centred around feelings of loss, heartbreak and disillusionment.

References

External links
Official website
American indie folk groups